Sorkheh Riz (also Romanized as Sorkheh Rīz) is a village in Aghmiyun Rural District, in the Central District of Sarab County, East Azerbaijan Province, Iran. At the 2006 census, its population was 60, in 16 families.

References 

Populated places in Sarab County